Álvaro Tarrto (12 April 1915 – 15 August 1998) was an Olympic freestyle swimmer from Brazil, who participated at one Summer Olympics. At the 1936 Summer Olympics in Berlin, he swam the 100-metre freestyle, not reaching the finals.

References

External links
  

1915 births
1998 deaths
Swimmers at the 1936 Summer Olympics
Olympic swimmers of Brazil
Brazilian male freestyle swimmers